Billboard Hot R&B Hits: 1989 is a compilation album released by Rhino Records in 1995, featuring 10 hit rhythm and blues recordings from 1989.

All tracks on the album were #1 hits on Billboard's Hot Black Singles chart. In addition, several of the songs were mainstream hits, charting on the Billboard Hot 100 during 1989.

Track listing
"Keep on Movin'" — Soul II Soul 3:37
"Me, Myself and I" — De La Soul 3:43
"Real Love" — Jody Watley 4:24
"All of My Love" — The Gap Band 4:51
"Baby Come to Me" — Regina Belle 4:15
"Shower Me with Your Love" — Surface 4:54
"Start of a Romance" — Skyy 3:47
"Ain't Nuthin' in the World" — Miki Howard 4:16
"Can't Get Over You" — Maze featuring Frankie Beverly 4:43
"Remember (The First Time)" — Eric Gable 3:43

Billboard Hot R&B Hits albums
1995 compilation albums
Rhythm and blues compilation albums